Navene Koperweis (born May 31, 1985) is an American drummer, best known as the former drummer of Animosity, Hoods and Animals as Leaders. He currently plays for Entheos, and serves as session drummer for Job for a Cowboy and also Machine Head.

Koperweis started drumming when he was eleven years old. He has played for The Faceless, and runs his technical death metal project, Fleshwrought, where he plays all instruments. He is also a dubstep/electronica producer, and is currently working on his debut electronic album.

His influences include Tim Alexander, Joey Jordison, Kevin Talley, John Longstreth, Terry Bozzio, Skrillex, Noisia, and Deadmau5.

Discography

Hoods 
 Prey for Death (2003)
 Hoods/Freya (2004)

Animosity 
 Shut It Down (2003)
 Empires (2005)
 Animal (2007)

The Faceless 
 Akeldama (track #4 only; 2006)

Fleshwrought 
 Dementia/Dyslexia (2010)

Animals as Leaders 
 Weightless (2011)
 The Joy of Motion (production; 2014)

Navene K 
 Human Design (EP; 2012)
 "Tear It Up" (Single; 2013)
 "Night Movement" (Single; 2014)
 "Warrior / Secret Police" (Single; 2014)
 Mind (EP; 2014)

Evan Brewer 
 Your Itinerary (2013)

Entheos 
 Primal EP (2015)
 The Infinite Nothing (2016)
 Dark Future (2017)
 Time Will Take Us All (2023)

An Endless Sporadic 
 Magic Machine (2016)

The Minerva Conduct 
 "The Minerva Conduct" (2017)

Whitechapel 
 The Valley (2019)

Machine Head 
 Circle the Drain (2020) (stand-alone single)
 My Hands Are Empty (2020) (stand-alone single)
 Arrows in Words from the Sky (2021) (EP)
 Of Kingdom and Crown (2022)

References

External links 
 
 Navene Koperweis at MetalSucks
 Navene Koperweis at Meinl Cymbals website
 Navene Koperweis at Sickdrummer magazine
 Navene Koperweis at SoundCloud

1985 births
21st-century American drummers
21st-century American guitarists
American heavy metal drummers
American multi-instrumentalists
American electronic musicians
Animals as Leaders members
Dubstep musicians
Guitarists from California
Jewish American musicians
Jewish heavy metal musicians
Living people
Musicians from San Jose, California
Seven-string guitarists
The Faceless members
21st-century American Jews